Mercedes Mariana "Nina" Aragonés de Juárez (born 12 September 1929) is an Argentine politician who was Governor of Santiago del Estero Province from 2002 to 2004. The wife of longtime governor and local caudillo Carlos Arturo Juárez, Aragonés was the last head of a provincial state in Argentina removed from office through federal intervention.

She was the second-ever woman to serve as governor of a province in Argentina, and the first in Santiago del Estero. She assumed office upon the resignation of Governor , in whose ticket Aragonés had been elected as vice-governor. In 2004, facing numerous accusations of corruption and embezzlement, she was removed from office by President Néstor Kirchner through federal intervention, a constitutional mechanism wherein the federal government of Argentina can intervene in a provincial government.

In addition to the governorship, she held the positions of National Deputy representing Santiago del Estero, Minister of Women's Affairs, and president of the provincial chapter of the Female Peronist Party.

References 

1929 births
Living people
People from Santiago del Estero Province
Women governors of provinces of Argentina
Members of the Argentine Chamber of Deputies elected in Santiago del Estero
Women members of the Argentine Chamber of Deputies
Governors of Santiago del Estero Province
Vice Governors of Santiago del Estero Province